The Quincy Hawks are the athletic teams that represent Quincy University, located in Quincy, Illinois, in NCAA Division II intercollegiate sports. The Hawks compete as members of the West Division of the Great Lakes Valley Conference for all sports except men's volleyball, which is a member of the Midwestern Intercollegiate Volleyball Association. Since there is no men's volleyball at the Division II level, the men's volleyball team is the only program that plays at the Division I level. QU joined the GLVC in 1994.

Quincy added women's lacrosse in 2017 and men's lacrosse in 2018, bringing the total number of programs up to 23. Sprint football, a weight-restricted form of American football governed outside the NCAA structure, became the 24th varsity sport in 2022. QU is one of six charter members of the Midwest Sprint Football League.

Varsity teams

List of teams
 
 
Men's sports (13) 
 Baseball
 Basketball
 Bowling
 Cross country
 Football
 Golf
 Lacrosse
 Soccer
 Sprint football
 Tennis
 Track and field
 Volleyball

 
Women's sports (11) 
 Basketball
 Bowling
 Cross country
 Golf
 Lacrosse
 Soccer
 Softball
 Tennis
 Track and field
 Volleyball

National championships

Team

Individual sports

Football
First Season - 1916

1993 National Champion - No. 1 in the final NCAA Division II Non-Scholarship Football Poll released by Don Hansen's National College Football Weekly Gazette.

Soccer
The men's soccer team won the NAIA national men's soccer championship a record eleven times, 1966–67, 1971, 1973–75, and 1977–81 (the five consecutive titles is also a record) and finished second in 1968 and 1970. The program moved to the NCAA's Division I in 1984.  From 1987 through 1990, the Hawks competed in the Big Central Soccer Conference and was an associate member of the Mid-Continent Conference in 1994 and 1995. In 1996, both Quincy and SIU Edwardsville joined the GLVC, stepping down to division II.

Softball
Prior to joining the NCAA, Quincy's women won the NAIA national softball championship in 1985 (after being runners-up the previous year).

References

External links